Zima (Zeme) is a town in Irkutsk Oblast, Russia, located at the point where the Trans-Siberian Railway crosses the Oka River. Population:

Geography
The town is situated on a low-lying plain, heavily water-logged. The Zima River joins the Oka in the town's vicinity.

Climate

History

The village of Staraya Zima on the present site of the town was established in 1743. In 1772, its population began to grow more quickly due to the construction of a horse-tract from Moscow which crossed the Oka River. Until the 1900s, Zima remained a roadside, mainly agricultural village.

In 1898, the Trans-Siberian railway was built through the village and a railroad station was opened. Town status was granted to Zima in 1925.

Zima's population remained at around 40,000 from the 1960s until 1990; however, after the dissolution of the Soviet Union and the associated economic crisis, the population decreased by around 15% during the 1990s.

The town is the birthplace of Yevgeny Yevtushenko, a Russian poet, the author of the biographical poem "Zima Station".

Administrative and municipal status
Within the framework of administrative divisions, Zima serves as the administrative center of Ziminsky District, even though it is not a part of it. As an administrative division, it is incorporated separately as the Town of Zima—an administrative unit with the status equal to that of the districts. As a municipal division, the Town of Zima is incorporated as Ziminskoye Urban Okrug.

Economy
Zima's economy relies mainly on timber production and railway-related services.

Transportation
The town has a station on the Trans-Siberian Railway, with commuter trains to Irkutsk and Tulun. The M53 Federal highway (Krasnoyarsk–Irkutsk) passes through Zima.

References

Notes

Sources

External links

Official website of Zima 
Zima Business Directory 
Mojgorod.ru. Entry on Zima 
Zima Station. Yevgeny Yevtyshenko's poem about his home town 

Cities and towns in Irkutsk Oblast
Populated places established in 1743
1743 establishments in the Russian Empire
Irkutsk Governorate